Franco Donna is a retired Italian rifle shooter. He won the individual European title in three positions in 1969 and the team world title in the 50 meter rifle prone in 1970.

References

Living people
Year of birth missing (living people)
Italian male sport shooters
20th-century Italian people